"Hollywood" is a country song performed and written by Kasey Chambers and produced by her brother, Nash Chambers, released in August 2004 as the lead single from her third studio album Wayward Angel (2004).

The song was nominated for "Most Performed Country Work" at the APRA Music Awards of 2005 and 2006, losing out to Chambers' own "Like a River" in 2005 and "Pony" in 2006.

Track listing

Charts

References

2004 songs
2004 singles
Kasey Chambers songs
Songs written by Kasey Chambers